Andrea Paolo Mario Dotti was an Italian psychiatrist-neurologist and the second husband of Audrey Hepburn from 1969 to 1982.

Biography
Dotti met Hepburn in June 1968 on a cruise aboard a yacht owned by an Italian socialite, They married on 18 January 1969. Dotti had one child with Hepburn, a son named Luca, born on 8 February 1970. 

Dotti and Hepburn were married for 12 years, Much of the marriage was tumultuous due to Dotti's affairs with younger women. Hepburn stayed with Dotti as long as possible for the sake of her sons. However, the couple divorced in 1982. 

Dotti died in Rome on 30 September 2007 after complications from a colonoscopy.

References 

1938 births
2007 deaths
Counts of Italy
Deaths from cancer in Lazio
Deaths from colorectal cancer
Italian psychiatrists